Josip Leko (born 19 September 1948) is a Croatian politician who served as Speaker of the Croatian Parliament from 2012 to 2015.

Biography

He was born in 1948 in Plavna village (Bač municipality) in Bačka, Serbia (then Yugoslavia) to a Croatian family from Ledinac near Grude in western Herzegovina. When he was one and a half years old the family returned to Herzegovina.

He finished high school in Herzegovina and went to university in Zagreb, Croatia where he got a major in law.

On 19 June 2012 he became a president of the Executive Council of the Social Democratic Party of Croatia.

When in 2013 he became the Speaker of the Parliament he became the first Croat from Herzegovina to hold such a high position in Croatian politics.

Career
Leko was deputy speaker from 23 December 2011 to 30 September 2012, when he succeeded Boris Šprem, who died in office, as interim speaker. He had already been acting as speaker during Šprem's absence due to cancer treatment in Houston, Texas.
He was proposed as the permanent Speaker of the Parliament by the ruling coalition and was confirmed on 10 October 2012, by a vote of 123 parliamentarians out of 151.

On 3 June 2016, Croatian Parliament appointed him as a justice of the Constitutional Court of Croatia and he took his position on 7 June.

References 

1948 births
Living people
Faculty of Law, University of Zagreb alumni
Social Democratic Party of Croatia politicians
Speakers of the Croatian Parliament
Bač, Serbia
Croats of Vojvodina